Rated X is a 2000 American television film starring brothers Charlie Sheen and Emilio Estevez, with the latter also directing. Based on the nonfiction book X-Rated by David McCumber, the film chronicles the story of the Mitchell brothers, Jim and Artie, who were pioneers in the pornography and strip club businesses in San Francisco in the 1970s and 1980s. The film focuses on the making of their most profitable film, Behind the Green Door. It also portrays Artie's descent into drug addiction.

Cast
 Charlie Sheen as Artie Jay Mitchell
 Robert Clark as Teenage Artie Mitchell
 Emilio Estevez as James Lloyd "Jim" Mitchell
 Taylor Estevez as Teenage Jim Mitchell 
 Geoffrey Blake as Michael Kennedy
 Rafer Weigel as Lionel
 Tracy Hutson as Marilyn Chambers
 Royce Hercules as Johnnie Keyes
 Megan Ward as Meredith Bradford
 Danielle Brett as Adrienne
 Terry O'Quinn as J.R. Mitchell
 Nicole de Boer as Karen Mitchell
 Deborah Grover as Georgia Mae Mitchell
 Kim Poirier as Jamie, The Actress

Production
The film was shot in Hamilton, Ontario, and Toronto, Ontario.

Release
Rated X was first screened at the 2000 Sundance Film Festival on January 25, 2000 before making its network debut on May 13.

Reception
Rated X received mixed critical reviews. The film holds a 25% rating on Rotten Tomatoes based on eight reviews.

References

External links
 
 
 Interview with Emilio Estevez and Charlie Sheen

2000 drama films
2000 television films
2000 films
American independent films
Films about pornography
Films based on non-fiction books
Films directed by Emilio Estevez
Films scored by Tyler Bates
Films set in San Francisco
Films set in the 1970s
Films set in the 1980s
Films shot in Hamilton, Ontario
Fratricide in fiction
American drama television films
2000s English-language films
2000s American films